Elk Haus was a professional continental cycling team based in Austria and participates in UCI Europe Tour and when selected as a wildcard to UCI ProTour events. The team is managed by Alexander Albrecht, Bernhard Rassinger, Josef Regec and Wolfgang Wesely.

The team folded after the 2009 season, due to financial insecurity. The team's management will take the 2010 season off from competition while trying to put together a new formation for 2011.

Rosters

2009 
As of 8 May 2009.

2008

Ages as of 1 January 2008.

References

External links
 Official Site 

Defunct cycling teams
Cycling teams based in Austria
Cycling teams disestablished in 2009
Cycling teams established in 2002
2002 establishments in Austria
2009 disestablishments in Austria